Mycoacia rubiginosa is a species of toothed crust fungus in the family Meruliaceae. It was described as a new species in 2004 by mycologists Kurt Hjortstam and Leif Ryvarden. The type collection was made in Sierra Nevada de Santa Marta, in Magdalena, Colombia, where the fungus was found growing on dead hardwood. It is known only from the type locality. The hyphal system is monomitic, containing only generative hyphae. The spores are ellipsoid, smooth, thin-walled and translucent, with dimensions of 4–4.5 by 2.5–2.75 µm.

References

Meruliaceae
Fungi of Colombia
Sierra Nevada de Santa Marta
Fungi described in 2004
Taxa named by Leif Ryvarden